Blue Haven is a suburb on the Central Coast of New South Wales, Australia, located on Pacific Highway at Wallarah Creek.

The suburb has an Aldi Supermarket and Medical Centre.

History

Blue Haven was once made up of several dirt roads (the main road being 'Roper Road', the only way in or out of Blue Haven at the time) and surrounded by bushland. It's now made up of hundreds of streets and has 3 different main entries and exits. The wetland areas are now preserved areas. Blue Haven, in the past, would suffer from constant bushfires in the dry season.

Pre-1991
Before it was named Blue Haven, the suburb was known as Blueridge Estate – and depending on where mail was sent, the northern area was Doyalson and the southern area was Charmhaven.

Population
According to the 2016 census of Population, there were 6,378 people in Blue Haven.
 Aboriginal and Torres Strait Islander people made up 7.4% of the population. 
 84.3% of people were born in Australia. The most common countries of birth were England 3.1% and New Zealand 1.6%.   
 91.4% of people only spoke English at home. 
 The most common responses for religion were No Religion 26.7%, Catholic 26.7% and Anglican 26.4%.

Geography
Blue Haven is bounded by Pacific Highway to the east, the Doyalson Link Road (linking to the Pacific Motorway) to the north, Spring Creek to the west and Wallarah Creek to the south. Spring Creek and Wallarah Creek are connected to Tuggerah Lake, one of Australia's largest coastal saltwater lakes.

Education
Blue Haven contains a state primary school, Blue Haven Public School (No.4623), which commenced in 1999 and, as of 2 September 2008, had over 600 students from kindergarten to year 6, and 33 teaching and administrative staff. The neighbouring suburb of San Remo is home to Northlakes High School, which opened in 1981 and has over 1000 students.

Environment
There are several wetland areas located in the southern parts of the town. Blue Haven also has an Oval, skate park, basketball courts and a community centre located on Apsley Court.
 
The Community Centre incorporates an After School Care facility and a "Schools as Community Centre" that operates in conjunction with Blue Haven Public School.

There are also several parks and reserves located within the estate, these include:
Blue Haven Pocket Park – The Circuit
Blueridge Drive Reserve – Blueridge Drive
Lady Laurel Drive Reserve – 18 Lady Laurel Drive
Lawrance Reserve – 36 St Lawrence Avenue
Miller Crescent Reserve – 10 Marsden Road
Redgum Hilltop Park – 1 Elkington Drive
Spring Creek Reserve – Corner Olney Drive and Waterhen Close

In October 2015, an Aldi supermarket opened on the corner of Blue Haven Way and Roper Rd.  Blue Haven previously had only one shop, Blueys Grocery, Takeaway & More Store located 2 White Swan Drive.  The shop is now for lease and is bound to be back operating as a coffee/takeaway corner store again soon.

Transport
Blue Haven is served by three public transport routes, provided by Busways Wyong and some 98 services operated by Coastal Liner (CDCNSW):

• 96 Wyee Stn to Budgewoi Via Blue Haven, San Remo and Buff Point 
 98 Lake Haven to Blue Haven and Chain Valley Bay.
 99 Lake Haven to Blue Haven, Gwandalan, Swansea and Charlestown.

Local Sport
Blue Haven Raiders Junior Rugby League Club was established in 2006 by foundation members Brian Howden, Mark D'Silva and Mick & Jackie James.

Blue Haven entered the Central Coast competition in 2007 with 10 teams. Every year the Raiders have increased in size. In 2010, the Raiders expanded to 20 teams, 280 boys and girls participating from 6 to 16 years.

The Green Machine as they are affectionately known, will join the Central Coast Senior Rugby league Competition in 2011, entering two U/17 and one U/19 team.

Blue Haven Raiders J.R.L.C., visit www.bluehavenraiders.com.au

References

Suburbs of the Central Coast (New South Wales)